Gun control in Russia is carried out in accordance with the Federal Law on Weapons. The law establishes three major categories of weapons: civil, service, and military.

Overview
 Russian citizens over 18 years of age can obtain a firearms license after attending gun-safety classes and passing a federal test and background check.  Firearms may be acquired for self-defense, hunting, or sports activities, as well as for collection purposes. Carrying permits may be issued for hunting firearms licensed for hunting purposes. Initially, purchases are
After five years of shotgun ownership, rifles may be purchased. Handguns are generally not allowed, but with the growing popularity of practical shooting events and competitions in Russia in recent years (e.g., IPSC), handgun ownership has now been allowed and the handguns have to be stored at a shooting club. Suppressors are prohibited. An individual cannot possess more than ten guns (up to five shotguns and up to five rifles) unless they are part of a registered gun collection.

History of changes
In 2014 Russia relaxed its gun laws by allowing concealed carry firearms for self-defense purposes; simplifying regulations for foreigners who legally bring their firearms to Russia; and making regulations stricter for firearm licensing, safekeeping, and for the purchase of non-lethal firearms.

In July 2016, requirements were updated for registration, licensing, and storage of hunting, sporting, pneumatic, and gas weapons. 

In the wake of the Kazan school shooting various proposals for tighter gun control were voiced and a bill drafted earlier and submitted in December 2020 is to be considered by the State Duma in May 2021.

See also
Gun control in the Soviet Union

References 

Russia
Law of Russia